Kaduwela is a suburb of Colombo in the Colombo District, Western Province, Sri Lanka.

Etymology
Kaduwela was originally Kadudevola, a compound of Kadu (sword) and Devola (shrine). It was the location of a shrine of the goddess Pattini, linked to a golden sword used in the 'water cutting' ritual. The shrine is called the Purana Rankadu Pattini Maha Devale (ancient great shrine of the golden-sword Pattini).

In another possibility Kaduwela simply means the jungle paddy field. Kadu means jungle (Sorata Thera's Sinhala–Sinhala dictionary) and wela means paddy field. There is also another Kaduwela in the Ukuwela division of Matale district

According to Robert Percival of the 19th Regiment of Foot, during the Revolt of 1797 against the Dutch, the Sinhalese threw up earthworks and established a fort here.

After the British defeat in the 1st Kandyan War, Kaduwela was occupied by a small force of British sepoys and lascoreens. They were later reinforced by a mixed force of European troops and sepoys under Captain Charles Wilkinson Mercer of the 51st Regiment, prior to the Battle of Hanwella.

Kaduwela Municipal Council

Demographics
Kaduwela Municipality area is a multi-ethnic, multi-religious urban centre. According to the census of 2012 the demographics by ethnicity and religion is as follows:.

See also
List of towns in Western Province, Sri Lanka

References

External links
 Kaduwela Municipal Council 

Populated places in Western Province, Sri Lanka